Ahmed Shafik (born ) is an Egyptian male volleyball player. He is part of the Egypt men's national volleyball team. On club level he plays for Al Ahly.

References

External links
 Profile at FIVB.org

1994 births
Living people
Egyptian men's volleyball players
Place of birth missing (living people)
Olympic volleyball players of Egypt
Al Ahly (men's volleyball) players